Sir Arthur William Johns, KCB, CBE (1873 – 13 January 1937) was a British naval architect. He was Director of Naval Construction from 1930 to 1936 or 1937.

References 

 https://www.nytimes.com/1937/01/14/archives/sir-arthur-johns-naval-expert-dies-former-head-of-construction-at.html
 http://www.dreadnoughtproject.org/tfs/index.php/Arthur_William_Johns

1873 births
1937 deaths
British naval architects
Knights Commander of the Order of the Bath
Commanders of the Order of the British Empire